OFIS Architects is a firm of architects established in 1996 by Rok Oman and Špela Videčnik, both graduates of the Ljubljana School of Architecture and the London Architectural Association. Upon graduation, they had already won several prominent competitions, such as the Football Stadium Maribor and the Ljubljana City Museum extension and renovation. Many of their projects have been nominated for awards, including the Mies van der Rohe award. In 2013, they received the Plecnik medal for the Habitable Space Habitable Wheel, in 2012 they received the Platinum Pen award for their international achievements, in 2009 they received a silver IOC/IAKS medal for their football stadium, in 2006 they received the European Grand Prix for Innovation Award, in 2005 their Villa Bled received an honorable mention at the Miami Biennial and in 2004 they were highly commended for their City Museum renovation and extension by the UK Architectural Review’s annual AR+D awards. In 2000, they won the “Young architect of the year” award in London.

The company is based in Ljubljana, Slovenia, but works internationally. They won a large business complex in Venice Marghera, Italy, and a residential complex in Graz, Austria. However, it was by winning 180 apartments in Paris, France their first large-scale development abroad, which led them to open a branch office in France, in 2007. This has been followed by a second large-scale development with the construction of a football stadium for FC BATE in Borisov, Belarus, due for completion in 2013. They also have partner firm agreements in London, Paris, and Moscow. Their academic career involves teaching at Harvard University in the USA, Architectural Association in London, UK, UCLA in LA, USA, and many more...

Foundation
The beginnings of OFIS' activities date back to the nineties, which was as an exciting yet difficult period for the former Yugoslavian republics that were undergoing intense self-re-evaluation and reinvention from scratch, economically and culturally. In terms of architecture, this meant that most of the larger architectural offices had to be scaled down or went bankrupt and so creating a space for younger groups or individuals to participate in architectural competitions.

Work 
The firm's work encompasses architecture, urbanism, art, and stage design. It ranges from new buildings to interventions within old structures; scales from stadiums down to a small farewell chapel; programs from social housing, luxurious villas and residences, sports facilities, and cultural and office programs. Over the past ten years, they have been dealing with various national and international clients from the private sector to the commercial sector and also state institutions.

Recognition
The firm has won several national and international competitions. Many projects have been nominated for a Mies van der Rohe award, i2009 they received a Silver IOC/IAKS medal for the football stadium, and in 2006 they received the European Grand Prix for Innovation Award, in 2005 their Villa under-extension received an honorable mention at the Miami Bienal, in 2004 they were awarded a high commendation for their City Museum renovation and extension by the UK Architectural Review's annual AR+D awards, and in 2000 they won the 'Young Architect of the year award in London, UK.

Their work has been shown on various TV channels including Discovery and RTL. They have exhibited worldwide including at the Venice Biennale of Architecture, the Architectural Biennale in Beijing, and the Biennale in Moscow. Additionally, OFIS Architects has been presented on the Deutsche Welle TV series  and CCTV from China.

Selected awards
 April 13, Plecnik award, Space Habitable Wheel, Ljubljana, SLO
 Dec 12, Trend Awards, Space Habitable Wheel, Ljubljana, SLO 
 Oct 12. Platinum Pencil 2012, the award for extensive architectural achievements, Ljubljana, SLO
 Jan 11 - Mies van der Rohe Awards '10 Nomination for Farewell Chapel
 Nov 10 - Chernikhov prize 2010, selected nominee, ICIF, Moscow, RU
 Mar 10 - ArchDaily Building of the year 2009, Religious, Farewell Chapel
 Sep 09 - IOC/IAKS award, silver medal for Football Stadium Maribor
 May 9 - Mies van der Rohe Awards '08, Nomination for Football Stadium Maribor, selection
 May 9 - Mies van der Rohe Awards '08, Nomination for Shopping roof apartments
 May 9 - Mies van der Rohe Awards '08, Nomination for Hayrack Apartments
 Jan 07 - Mies van der Rohe Awards '06, Nomination for Housing on the Coast
 Dec 06 - European Grand Prix for innovation awards, Monaco
 Jan 06 - Bienal Miami 2005, honors for villa under-extension, Miami, USA
 Dec 04 - AR+D awards, High commendation for the city museum Ljubljana
 Dec 01 - Design Vanguard 2001, architectural record, New York, USA
 Jan 01 - Young Architect of the Year Award, winner, YAYA, London, UK
 Nov 00 - Piranesi award, honors for housing block 16x68, Piran, SLO

Publications
Their work is published around the globe with more than 200 international publications a year including the New York Times, The Guardian, The Independent, El País, Der Spiegel, Die Welt, Bild, most architectural magazines, and various books. In 2000 Zaha Hadid selected them as one of her top 10 exceptional emerging architects for Phaidon 10x10. In 2006 Gustavo Gili published monograph issue 2G on OFIS. The Hinge magazine chose their Farewell chapel as a Stand up building in 2009, Lace and Tetris apartments were announced as two of the Worlds 10 most creative apartment buildings by Oddee and Guardian Arts Critics chose them as an Architectural Office to ˝Look out for˝. In 2011 DAMDI published OFIS_open archive files 98-11, their second monograph issue DD series.

Picture gallery

Videos
 Tetris Apartments
 Shopping Roof Apartments
 Basket Apartments
 Alpine Hut
 Hayrack Apartments
 Honeycomb Apartments
 City Museum Ljubljana 
 Lace Apartments
 650 Apartments
 Baroque Court Apartments
 Shopping Roof Apartments
 Farewell Chapel
 Football Stadium MB
 Dot Envelope
 Villa Under-extension

References

External links 
 OFIS website
 OFIS Arhitekti Archdaily
 High Design, for a House of God , Fast Company
 "Building the Future" OFIS presented on Deutsche Welle TV Series
Glass House on Black Mirror, Season 5, episode 2, Netflix, Smithereens (Black Mirror)

Companies based in Ljubljana
Companies established in 1996
Slovenian architects